Edward M. Holland (born November 28, 1939) is an attorney in Northern Virginia and was a member of the Virginia Senate from 1972 - 1996.

Early life and education
Holland was born in Washington, DC on November 28, 1939.  He attended the Hill School and graduated from Princeton University in 1962.  He received his law degree from the University of Virginia in 1965 and was admitted to the Virginia bar. Holland received a masters in tax law from Georgetown University in 1967.

Political career
In 1972, Holland ran for and was elected as a Democrat to the Virginia Senate representing part of Arlington County, Virginia.  He served for 24 years in that body on a number of committees, including Courts of Justice, Commerce and Labor, Finance, Education and Health, and Rules.  He chaired Courts of Justice for a number of years.  During his time in the Senate, Holland also served on the  Judicial Council of Virginia, the Committee on District Courts and the Northern Virginia Transportation Commission.

Legal practice
Ed Holland maintains a law office in Falls Church, Virginia.

References

 

1939 births
Living people
People from Washington, D.C.
Democratic Party Virginia state senators
Princeton University alumni
University of Virginia School of Law alumni
Georgetown University alumni
People from Arlington County, Virginia